Ruslan Faritovich Zainullin (born 14 February 1982) is a Russian professional ice hockey center currently playing for Kuban Krasnodar of the Russian second tier Higher Hockey League (VHL). His National Hockey League rights belong to the Calgary Flames.

Playing career
Zainullin was drafted 34th overall by the Tampa Bay Lightning in the 2000 NHL Entry Draft after playing his first professional season in the Russian Super League with Ak Bars Kazan. Despite being drafted in the NHL, Zainullin has never played in the league, opting to remain in Russia.

Playing with HC MVD in 2007–08, he recorded his most prolific season with 23 points in 50 games.

Career statistics

Regular season and playoffs

International

Transactions
 5 March 2001 - Traded to Phoenix Coyotes by Tampa Bay with Mike Johnson, Paul Mara and New York Islanders' 2nd-round choice (previously acquired, Phoenix selected Matthew Spiller) in 2001 NHL Entry Draft for Nikolai Khabibulin and Stan Neckar.
 19 March 2002 - Rights traded to Atlanta Thrashers by Phoenix with Kirill Safronov and Phoenix's 4th-round choice (Patrick Dwyer) in 2002 NHL Entry Draft for Darcy Hordichuk and Atlanta's 4th (Lance Monych) and 5th (John Zeiler) round choices in 2002 NHL Entry Draft.
15 November 2002 - Traded to Calgary Flames by Atlanta for Marc Savard.

External links

 

1982 births
Living people
Ak Bars Kazan players
HC CSKA Moscow players
HC Dynamo Moscow players
HC MVD players
HC Neftekhimik Nizhnekamsk players
HC Spartak Moscow players
Tatar people of Russia
Tatar sportspeople
Torpedo Nizhny Novgorod players
Russian ice hockey right wingers
Tampa Bay Lightning draft picks